Malkowice  (till December 31, 2000 the official name of locality did not exist in Polish law) is a village in the administrative district of Gmina Bogoria, within Staszów County, Świętokrzyskie Voivodeship, in south-central Poland.

The village has a population of  144.

Demography 
According to the 2002 Poland census, there were 156 people residing in Malkowice village, of whom 53.8% were male and 46.2% were female. In the village, the population was spread out, with 19.9% under the age of 18, 32.7% from 18 to 44, 17.9% from 45 to 64, and 29.5% who were 65 years of age or older.
 Figure 1. Population pyramid of village in 2002 — by age group and sex

References

Villages in Staszów County